Shulie is a community in the Canadian province of Nova Scotia, located in  Cumberland County .

Once a thriving lumber town with a population of about 200 people (ca. 1900), today Shulie has a population of 2 people. It rises to approximately 8 during the summer months.

References

Communities in Cumberland County, Nova Scotia
Ghost towns in Nova Scotia
General Service Areas in Nova Scotia